Kim Walker-Smith (born December 19, 1981 as Kimberlee Dawn Walker) is an American singer, songwriter, worship leader, and recording artist. She produced her first solo album, Here Is My Song, which was released in February 2008 through the Jesus Culture record label. Walker-Smith is best known as the worship leader for the Jesus Culture Band and Jesus Culture events, and as a worship pastor for Bethel Church in Redding.

Her rendition of the John Mark McMillan song "How He Loves" has been viewed over 22 million times on YouTube. Her rendition of Brian Johnson's and Jon Mohr's song "Where You Go I Go" has over 9 million views on YouTube.

Personal life 

Kim Walker was born in Albany, Oregon, and "raised in a small farm town called Klamath Falls, Oregon." Her parents divorced when she was four years old. Her family moved frequently, causing her to be shy and withdrawn as a result of always being "the new kid". Walker stated that her family "for generations has been very musical and my mom put me on a stage when I was three. I grew up singing and was very involved in musical theater." Walker gave her life to God when she was eighteen years old. During a challenging season in her life while attending Bethel, she received a vision about the love God had for her, and was a changed person after that encounter.

In her early adulthood, Walker moved to Redding, California, to attend a Christian college, but was struggling with her grades and wasn't happy attending university. One night while driving around she cried out to the Lord, and came across a 24-hour prayer house that had been recently set up by Bethel Church. Venturing inside, Walker was captivated and attended their church service the following Sunday. After a year she left university to attend the Bethel School of Supernatural Ministry (BSSM). She graduated from the BSSM after completing their two-year program, and after two more years was hired by the church as a worship pastor. Walker has stated that the "greatest desire of [her] heart is to see God's kingdom and power manifest for people to be set free, healed, and radically changed as they encounter God in worship."

In 2005, Walker's "powerful voice won her $25,000 cash in an American Idol type of competition called So You Want to Be a Star, which aired on Chico television station KRVU.  [She] is considered by many to be a forerunner in a new kind of worship referred to as prophetic worship." Walker has cited Misty Edwards of the International House of Prayer and Suzy Yaraei of Morning Star Ministries, both prominent worship leaders in the evangelical community, as her greatest musical influences.

In 2009, Walker married Skyler William Smith (born March 25, 1981), another worship leader who also does graphic design and photography. She now releases music under the name Kim Walker-Smith instead of her maiden name. In addition to her career of solo albums, she is also a member of the band Jesus Culture, which began as a youth worship band at Bethel, but now hosts multiple worship conferences around the country and produces a live record each year, in addition to frequently leading worship at Bethel. In 2010, Walker-Smith stated that she was "at Bethel once to twice a month right now. We travel about three to four times a month. About 40 percent of that is Jesus Culture." She has also expressed a desire for her music to expand into the secular community, expressing a passion for social justice and "to see the arts and creativity restored and a new standard set". "I've always looked at music as a vehicle to get me to people".

On July 16, 2013, Walker-Smith and her husband, Skyler, released Home, their first album together. Their son, Wyatt Smith, was born September 25, 2013. Their second son, Bear, was born in December 2014. In December 2016 Kim announced she and Skyler were expecting their third child, a girl, and that she is working on another Jesus Culture album. In early March, Jesus Culture announced that Walker-Smith would be releasing her first solo album since 2013, titled On My Side, on April 21.  The album reached No. 1 on Billboard Top Christian Albums Chart as of May 13, 2017.  On June 9, 2017, Walker-Smith gave birth to her daughter, Maisie.

Discography

Studio albums

Live albums

EPs

Holiday albums

Singles

As lead artist

As a featured artist

Other charted songs

Awards and nominations 
Kim Walker-Smith, with her worship band, Jesus Culture, was nominated for Best Contemporary Christian Music Album at the 61st Annual Grammy Awards for their album, Living With a Fire.

Notes

References

External links 

 Jesus Culture bio page

1981 births
People from Albany, Oregon
Living people
21st-century American singers
American performers of Christian music
American Pentecostals